Nova revija may refer to:
Nova revija (Croatian magazine), a theological magazine in Croatia published from 1922 till 1941
Nova revija (magazine), a magazine in Slovenia established in 1982
Nova revija (publishing company), a publishing house in Slovenia